The American Osteopathic Board of Neuromusculoskeletal Medicine (AOBNMM) is an organization that provides board certification to qualified Doctors of Osteopathic Medicine (D.O.) in the medical specialty of neuromusculoskeletal medicine. The AOBNMM is one of 18 medical specialty certifying boards of the American Osteopathic Association Bureau of Osteopathic Specialists approved by the American Osteopathic Association (AOA). As of December 2011, 482 osteopathic physicians hold active certification with the AOBNMM.  

The AOBNMM also offers a Certificate of Added Qualification in Sports Medicine.

Board certification
Certification is potentially available to osteopathic physicians who have successfully completed an AOA-approved residency in neuromusculoskeletal medicine/osteopathic manipulative medicine (NMM/OMM) and hold an unlimited license to practice. Successful completion of written, oral, and practical examinations are also required for certification.
 
Board certification in neuromusculoskeletal medicine/osteopathic medicine (NMM/OMM) is required of physicians in order to chair an osteopathic manipulative medicine department at a medical school, or to serve as a director for a NMM/OMM residency program. Since 1995, diplomates of the American Osteopathic Board of Neuromusculoskeletal Medicine must renew their certification every ten years to avoid expiration of their board certification status.

See also
 AOA Bureau of Osteopathic Specialists

References

External links
 AOBNMM homepage	
 American Osteopathic Association
 	

Organizations established in 1977
Osteopathic medical associations in the United States
Medical and health organizations based in Indiana